Darrell Maurice Parker is an Australian Anglican bishop who has served as Bishop of North West Australia (the largest diocese in geographical size in the Anglican Church of Australia, covering approximately a quarter of the Australian continent) since 15 February 2023.

Parker grew up in southern New South Wales, and studied at Moore Theological College. Prior to his consecration as bishop, Parker served for 25 years in the Anglican Diocese of Armidale, serving in the parishes of Walcha, Boggabilla, Tenterfield, and the St Mark’s Chapel at the University of New England. His final role prior to being appointed bishop was serving six years as Vicar of West Tamworth. He was also appointed Archdeacon of the MacIntyre and New England within the diocese.

Parker was consecrated as bishop on 3 February 2023 by Archbishop of Sydney Kanishka Raffel, and installed as Bishop of North West Australia on 15 February 2023.

Parker is married to Elizabeth and has four children.

References

Anglican bishops of North West Australia
Living people
Evangelical Anglican bishops
21st-century Anglican bishops in Australia
Year of birth missing (living people)